Clinton Wheeler (October 27, 1959 – February 14, 2019) was an American professional basketball player. He was a 6'1" (185 cm) 185 lb (84 kg) point guard and played collegiately at Division III's William Paterson University. In his brief NBA career from 1987 to 1989, he played for three teams.

Life 
Wheeler played high school basketball at Long Branch High School in Long Branch, New Jersey.

A product of the William Paterson University program where he played four years, Wheeler scored 1,624 points for WP, which put him in third position on the school's all-time list, when he left college in 1981. In the 1979–80 season, he averaged 26.1 points a contest and 22.4 points a game in 1980–81.

During the 1980s, Wheeler played frequently in the Jersey Shore Basketball League which was a Pro-Am league that played outdoors at the Headliner in Neptune, NJ. NBA players and NJ residents like Kelly Tripucka, Roy Hinson, and Mike O'Koren also played. Wheeler's spectacular plays were memorialized by the PA announcer with "Wow Wheeler!" after an impressive basket.

Wheeler was selected by the Kansas City Kings in the 7th round (12th pick) of the 1981 NBA Draft. He is ranked eighth on the Albany Patroons' all-time regular season scoring list. From 1989 to 1993, he played for Bayer Leverkusen in Germany's top flight Basketball Bundesliga, where he formed a successful duo with fellow American Kannard Johnson. Wheeler won four German national championship titles with Leverkusen.

He died February 14, 2019, at age 59.

References

External links
NBA stats @ basketballreference.com

1959 births
2019 deaths
Albany Patroons players
Albuquerque Silvers players
American expatriate basketball people in Germany
American expatriate basketball people in the Philippines
American men's basketball players
Basketball players from New Jersey
Bayer Giants Leverkusen players
Charlotte Hornets expansion draft picks
Indiana Pacers players
Kansas City Kings draft picks
Long Branch High School alumni
Miami Heat players
People from Neptune Township, New Jersey
Philippine Basketball Association imports
Point guards
Portland Trail Blazers players
Rapid City Thrillers players
Rochester Renegade players
Sportspeople from Long Branch, New Jersey
Tampa Bay Thrillers players
William Paterson Pioneers men's basketball players
Barangay Ginebra San Miguel players
Sportspeople from Monmouth County, New Jersey